Deinodryinus is a genus of wasps belonging to the family Dryinidae.

The genus has almost cosmopolitan distribution.

Species

Species:

Deinodryinus ambrensis 
Deinodryinus aptianus 
Deinodryinus aptianus

References

Dryinidae
Hymenoptera genera